Catherine Allégret (born 16 April 1946) is a French actress. She is the daughter of Simone Signoret and Yves Allégret.

In 2007, she portrayed Édith Piaf's grandmother Louise Gassion in Olivier Dahan's biopic La Vie En Rose (La Môme in French).

Personal life
Allégret has been married twice. Her first marriage was to Jean-Pierre Castaldi, with whom she has a son, Benjamin Castaldi. Her second husband is Maurice Vaudaux, with whom she has a daughter, Clémentine.

In 2004, Allégret published a memoir titled World Upside Down (Un monde à l'envers) in which she wrote that she was sexually abused by her stepfather Yves Montand for many years from the age of 5.

Selected filmography 
 Lady L (1965)
 The Sleeping Car Murders (1965)
 An Ace and Four Queens (1966)
 Time to Live (1969)
 Elise, or Real Life (1970)
 Smic Smac Smoc (1971)
 It Only Happens to Others (1971)
 Last Tango in Paris (1972)
 Paul and Michelle (1974)
 Vincent, François, Paul and the Others (1974)
  (1976)
 Le braconnier de Dieu (1983)
 The Round Up (2010)
 Capitaine Marleau (2017) / 1 Episode
 Josephine, Guardian Angel (2018)
 Tomorrow Is Ours (2018-2021) / 122 Episodes

References

External links
 

1946 births
Living people
People from Neuilly-sur-Seine
French film actresses
French memoirists
French television actresses
20th-century French actresses
21st-century French actresses
French people of Polish-Jewish descent
French women memoirists